Backstage is a Canadian drama series about a performing arts high school created by Jennifer Pertsch and Lara Azzopardi. The series aired in Canada on Family Channel from March 18 to December 9, 2016, and in the United States on Disney Channel from March 25 to September 30, 2016. The series was also released on Netflix on September 30, 2017. The series' ensemble cast includes Devyn Nekoda, Alyssa Trask, Josh Bogert, Aviva Mongillo, Matthew Isen, and Julia Tomasone.

Series overview

Episodes

Season 1 (2016)

Season 2 (2017) 
 The season was released on Netflix in the United States on September 30, 2017.

See also 
 List of Backstage characters

References 

Lists of Canadian children's television series episodes
Lists of Canadian drama television series episodes
Lists of Disney Channel television series episodes